Events in the year 2016 in Eritrea.

Incumbents 

 President: Isaias Afewerki

Events 

 12 – 13 June – The Battle of Tsorona was fought between the army and Ethiopian forces near the border town of Tsorona, Eritrea.

Deaths

References 

 
2010s in Eritrea
Years of the 21st century in Eritrea
Eritrea
Eritrea